The York Valkyrie are the women's rugby league team of York RLFC (known as York City Knights from 2002 to 2022) based in York, England. The Valkyrie, who were established in 2016 as the York City Knights Ladies, compete in the Women's Super League and play their home games at York Community Stadium which is also home to the York RLFC men's team, the York Knights, and football club, York City F.C.

History
In May 2016 the York City Knights Ladies team was launched in partnership with the Knights Foundation. The team was formed to take part in the Women's Summer Merit League and although it included several players from the York Ladies team who had competed in the Women's Rugby League Association (winter season) League the head coach, Andy Fletcher, described it as "a brand new club and a brand new team". The partnership meant that the team had use of the facilities at the Knights training base at York St John University's sports park.

In 2017 the team went undefeated in the Merit League and won the Women's Challenge Shield. They were accepted into the RFL Women's Super League in 2018 but had a poor start losing their first game 40–0 to St Helens. The team initially struggled in the Super League where their first win did not come until their tenth match when they defeated Featherstone Rovers 20–12, and they won only one game in the 2019 season. Following the Covid-enforced cancellation of the 2020 season, the team made several changes both on and off the field. To provide off-field support for the team coaches the club created the role of ladies team manager in 2020 and in April 2021 Lindsay Anfield was appointed as their first director of women's rugby league. A few weeks later five players from Anfield's former club, Castleford, joined the team. York reached the final of 2021 Challenge Cup and were the winners of 2022 Women's Super League Leaders' Shield. They also had three players shortlisted for the 2022 Woman of Steel including Tara-Jane Stanley who won the award. On 14 October 2022 York City Knights announced that the club had changed its name to York RLFC, with the men's team still being known as the Knights and the women's team becoming the Valkyrie. As part of the rebrand both teams introduced new logos.

Stadiums

York St John University Sports Park

In 2012 York St John University acquired a sports park on Haxby Road, York, which they named 'York St John University Sports Centre Nestlé Rowntree Park'. A multi-million-pound redevelopment included the creation of a 3G pitch for football and rugby. The use of the sports park as a training base for the rugby club is part of a partnership agreement with the university. The women's team also used it for playing their home matches. On 23 April 2017 York City Knights Ladies played their first match at the sports park winning 10–8 against Huddersfield St Joseph’s Ladies.

In 2021 a £1 million investment, partly funded by the Rugby League World Cup CreatedBy programme, was used to build a 4G pitch matching the specifications of York Community Stadium. During the 2021 Rugby League World Cup the sports park hosted the Cook Islands women's team and was the venue for the warm-up match between the Valkyrie and the Papua New Guinea Orchids on 20 October 2022.

York Community Stadium

The York Community Stadium, which is home to football club York City F.C. and York RLFC, was first proposed in 2009 but due to numerous delays it was not completed until December 2020. 
However, the restrictions at the start of the 2021 Super League season meant that matches were the split between venues in Leeds and Warrington. In May 2021 the Valkyrie played their Challenge Cup semi-final match at the Community Stadium. The stadium, which has a capacity of 8,500, is a venue for the 2021 Women's Rugby League World Cup.

Players

2023 Squad

Internationals
Players who earned international caps while playing for York City Knights Ladies or York Valkyrie:

England
Hollie Dodd
Grace Field
Tara-Jane Stanley
Olivia Wood
Ireland
Bettie Lambert

Seasons

Honours
Challenge Shield: 2017
RFL Women's Super League:
League Leaders Shield: 2022
Women's Nines: 2022

References

External links

2016 establishments in England
Rugby clubs established in 2016
Sport in York
Women's rugby league teams in England
RFL Women's Super League
York City Knights